Dessau-Mosigkau station is a railway station in the Mosigkau district of the town of Dessau, located in Saxony-Anhalt, Germany.

References

Mosigkau
Buildings and structures in Dessau